Phyllodactylus reissii, also known commonly as Peters' leaf-toed gecko or the coastal leaf-toed gecko, is a species of lizard in the family Phyllodactylidae. The species is endemic to northwestern South America.

Etymology
The specific name, reissii, is in honor of Carl Reiss who collected the holotype, while he was the Prussian consul in Guayaquil, Ecuador.

Geographic range
P. reissii is native to Ecuador and Peru. There is an introduced population in the Galapagos.

Habitat

Description
P. reissii is large for its genus.

Reproduction
P. reissii is oviparous. The adult female lays a clutch of two eggs.

References

Further reading
Boulenger GA (1885). Catalogue of the Lizards in the British Museum (Natural History). Second Edition. Volume I. Geckonidæ, Eublepharidæ, Uroplatidæ, Pygopodidæ, Agamidæ. London: Trustees of the British Museum (Natural History). (Taylor and Francis, printers). xii + 436 pp. + Plates I-XXXII. (Phyllodactylus reissii, p. 80).
Goldberg SR (2007). "Notes on reproduction of Peters' Leaf-toed Gecko, Phyllodactylus reissii (Squamata, Gekkonidae), from Peru". Phyllomedusa 6 (2): 147–150.
Koch C, Flecks M, Venegas PJ, Bialke P, Valverde S, Rödder D (2016). "Applying n-dimensional hypervolumes for species delimitation: unexpected molecular, morphological, and ecological diversity in the Leaf-Toed Gecko Phyllodactylus reissii Peters, 1862 (Squamata: Phyllodactylidae) from northern Peru". Zootaxa 4161 (1): 041–080.
Peters W (1862). "Über einen neuen Phyllodactylus aus Guayaquil ". Monatsberichte der Königlichen Preussischen Akademie der Wissenschaften zu Berlin 1862: 626–627. (Phyllodactylus reissii, new species). (in German and Latin).
Rösler H (2000). "Kommentierte Liste der rezent, subrezent und fossil bekannten Geckotaxa (Reptilia: Gekkonomorpha)". Gekkota 2: 28–153. (Phyllodactylus reissii, p. 104). (in German).

Phyllodactylus
Reptiles of Ecuador
Reptiles of Peru
Reptiles described in 1862
Taxa named by Wilhelm Peters